The International Association of Jazz Record Collectors (IAJRC) is an international, non-profit organization devoted to the appreciation and preservation of recorded jazz. IAJRC has its own label, IAJRC Records.

History 
IAJRC was founded  years ago (1964) in Pittsburgh by William C. Love.  The organization incorporated in 1975 in Ohio as a non-profit entity, classified by the IRS as a 501(c)(3). The incorporators were James H. Beauchamp, Edward L. Shank, and Leo F. Krebs (born 1937), all of Dayton. The organization has published the IAJRC Journal four times a year for the past  years (since 1968), and has produced over 77 titles for IAJRC Records. Many peers, including TV and radio historian Tim Brooks, regard the IAJRC as a scholarly organization.

References

External links
 Official site

Organizations established in 1964
Jazz organizations
Jazz culture
501(c)(3) organizations
Magazine publishing companies of the United States
Jazz record labels